Killaloe Bridge is a road bridge over the River Shannon between Ballina in County Tipperary and Killaloe, County Clare in Ireland. Built on the site of an earlier structure (dating to c.1650), the eighteenth-century bridge has thirteen arches and includes a lifting section that was added in 1929. The bridge has only one vehicular lane, with traffic lights to control vehicle movement. The bridge is a protected structure, listed on the Record of Protected Structures by both Clare County Council (#210) and Tipperary County Council (#S672).

Monument
An ornate monument in the middle of the bridge commemorates four Irish Republican Army members who were shot on the bridge in 1920, during the Irish War of Independence. There is also a plaque recording the 1825 partial rebuild.

Eel management programme 
A trap and transport scheme is in force on the Shannon as part of an eel management programme following the discovery of reducing populations within the River Shannon. This scheme is intended to ensure safe passage for young eels between Killaloe Bridge and the Shannon Estuary.

New bridge crossing
Clare County Council and North Tipperary County Council have presented proposals for a new road to bypass Killaloe including a new Shannon bridge crossing, approximately 1 km south of the existing bridge. A mechanism for enforcing compulsory purchase order was confirmed in March 2013.

By 2018 detailed design planning was underway, on works for the Killaloe bypass and proposed new bridge. As of 2020, roadworks in Killaloe and Ballina were underway, with a proposed "target for the commencement of construction" on the bridge in "Spring 2022". A "sod turning" ceremony was held in late 2022, at which point the completion date was projected to some time in 2024.

References

External links

 National Inventory of Architectural Heritage record (20300805) Killaloe Bridge, Shantraud, Killaloe, Clare
 National Inventory of Architectural Heritage record (22306005) Killaloe Bridge, Cullenagh, Ballina, Tipperary North

River Shannon
Bridges in the Republic of Ireland
Buildings and structures in County Tipperary
Buildings and structures in County Clare